Liskeard East is an electoral division of Cornwall in the United Kingdom and returns one member to sit on Cornwall Council. The current Councillor is Sally Hawken, an Independent.

Extent
Liskeard East covers the centre and east of the town of Liskeard. The division covers 164 hectares in total.

Election results

2017 election

2013 election

References

Liskeard
Electoral divisions of Cornwall Council